Leonel Mário d'Alva (born 1935) is a São Toméan politician. He served as the prime minister of São Tomé and Príncipe from 21 December 1974 until 12 July 1975, when the country gained independence from Portugal.

From late 1975 to 1980, D'Alva was President of the São Toméan National Assembly. After the country's first democratic elections in 1991, he was again elected National Assembly President. He also served as foreign minister from 1975 to 1978 and was acting president from 4 March to 3 April 1991.

D'Alva co-founded the Democratic Convergence Party – Reflection Group (PCD–RG) in 1991 and subsequently led it for many years.

References

1935 births
Living people
Presidents of the National Assembly (São Tomé and Príncipe)
Foreign Ministers of São Tomé and Príncipe
Democratic Convergence Party (São Tomé and Príncipe) politicians
20th-century São Tomé and Príncipe politicians